Atelopus famelicus is a species of toad in the family Bufonidae endemic to Colombia. It is known from the Cordillera Occidental in Cauca and Valle del Cauca departments (the population in the latter has since been extirpated).

Description
Males grow to  while the females measure  in snout–vent length. Tympanum is absent. The fingers have rudimentary webbing while the toes are partially webbed. Coloration is generally reddish brown with yellowish tones towards the flanks. The belly is dirty yellowish with numerous fine brown or black spots. A yellow lateral line may be present.

Habitat and conservation
It probably has stream-dwelling tadpoles.

This species has only been recorded at two localities in Cauca and one in Valle del Cauca. The Cauca populations are threatened by habitat loss. Also chytridiomycosis could be a threat. The latest record of the species is from 2005 from the Valle de Cauca locality. However, the population there is now considered extinct because of drying of the habitat after road building. An exhaustive search in one the Cauca localities in 2000 did not record any specimens. The two Cauca localities are on the border of the Munchique National Natural Park. One of them was inside a private reserve that was in 2004 taken over by a guerilla group and no longer provides protection to the species.

References

famelicus
Amphibians of the Andes
Amphibians of Colombia
Endemic fauna of Colombia
Taxa named by Juan A. Rivero
Amphibians described in 1995
Taxonomy articles created by Polbot